Terminal is the third studio album by SMP, released in 2000 by Catastrophe Records. A critic at Last Sigh Magazine gave the album a positive review and called it "reminiscent of early nineties raves, in that it is intensely danceable with addictive hooks and crafted lyrics."

Track listing

Personnel
Adapted from the Terminal liner notes.

SMP
 Jason Bazinet – lead vocals, production, recording, mixing
 Sean Setterberg (as Sean Ivy) – production, recording, mixing, cover art, design
 Matt Sharifi – instruments

Production and design
 Aaron Edge – design
 Chris Hanzsek – mastering
 Lance Hayes – additional musicianship
 Heather Ivy – cover art, design, photography
 Xian Di Marris  – drums, design
 Jeremy Moss – additional musicianship
 Robert Sydow – engineering
 Deirdre Wehrman – photography

Release history

References

External links 
 Terminal at iTunes
 

2000 albums
SMP (band) albums